The Urban Assault Weapon is a U.S. Army program to develop a next-generation shoulder-launched infantry weapon to replace the current M72 LAW, M136 AT-4, and M141 Bunker Defeat Munition.

See also
 FGM-172 SRAW

References

External links
 Urban Assault Weapon (UAW) - Global Security

Rocket weapons of the United States
Proposed weapons of the United States